The Marine Department originally called the Marine Office  was created in 1755 as a result of the formation of the Corps of the Royal Marines and was a department within the Admiralty. The department was a civilian secretariat responsible for corresponding with the various Royal Marine Divisions. It existed until 1809 when its functions were merged into the Marine Pay Department. The department was administered by the First Secretary of the Marine who was supported by a deputy the Second Secretary of the Marine.

History
The Marine Department originally called the Marine Office was established in 1755 as a consequence of the creation of the Corps of the Royal Marines. under Admiralty control. The department was a civilian secretariat, whose role was to correspond and coordinate the administrative and logistical concerns of the three Marine divisions with the Admiralty that were located at Chatham, Plymouth, Portsmouth and Woolwich whose colonels were the most senior Marine officers. Subsequently, a Colonel-Commandant at Marine Headquarters in London was established as the senior officer of the Corps, the forerunner of the modern Adjutant-General of the Royal Marines. The department existed until 1809 when its functions were assumed by the Marine Pay Department.. The department was managed by the First Secretary to the Admiralty who was supported by the Second Secretary to the Admiralty who were both given the additional titles of Secretary then later First Secretary of the Marine; and Deputy Secretary later Second Secretary of the Marine.

Head of department

Secretary of the Marine 
 1755–1763: John Cleveland

First Secretary of the Marine 
 1763–1795: Philip Stephens 
 1795–1804: Sir Evan Nepean
 1804–1807: William Marsden
 1807–1809: William Wellesley Pole

Deputy Secretary of the Marine 
 1782–1783: John Ibbotson

Second Secretary of the Marine 
 1783–1796: John Ibbotson
 1797–1804: William Marsden
 1804: Benjamin Tucker
 1804–1806: John Barrow
 1806–1807: Benjamin Tucker
 1807–1809: Sir John Barrow

Supporting clerical staff

First Clerk in the Marine Department
Included: 
 1755–1766, G. Fearne
 1766–1782, G. Jackson
 1782–1789, J. Madden
 1789–1809, G. Coombe

Second Clerk in the Marine Department
Included: 
 1755–1760, J. Clevland
 1760–1782, J. Madden
 1782–1784, J. Bindley
 1784–1789, G. Coombe
 1789–1796, B. Maxwell
 1796–1809, S.Moss

Third Clerk in the Marine Department
Included: 
 1778–1782, J. Bindley
 1782–1809, G. Coombe

Extra Clerks in the Marine Department
Included: 
 1755–1760, B. Rogers
 1755–1760, J. Madden 
 1760–1770, H. Parker
 1770–1778, D. Forbes
 1778–1809, G. Coombe

Citations

Sources
 Archives, National (1688–1983). "Records of Royal Marines". nationalarchives.gov.uk. London, England: The National Archives. 
 Cock, Randolph; Rodger, N.A.M (September 2006). A guide to the naval records in the National Archives of the UK. London, England: University of London, Institute of Historical Research. .
 'Marine department', in Office-Holders in Modern Britain: Volume 4, Admiralty Officials 1660–1870, ed. J C Sainty (London, 1975), pp. 82–84. British History Online http://www.british-history.ac.uk/office-holders/vol4/pp82-84 [accessed 3 January 2019].
 Parliament, Great Britain. (1797) The Royal Kalendar and Court and City Register for England, Scotland, Ireland and the Colonies. W. March. London. England.
 Parliament, Great Britain. (1805) The Royal Kalendar and Court and City Register for England, Scotland, Ireland and the Colonies. W. March. London. England.

Admiralty departments